Elections to Metropolitan Borough of Southwark were held in 1949.

The borough had ten wards which returned between 3 and 8 members. Labour won all the seats.

Election result

|}

References

Council elections in the London Borough of Southwark
1949 in London
1949 English local elections